Excalibur is the name of several comic book titles featuring the team Excalibur and published by Marvel Comics, beginning with the original Excalibur comic book series which debuted in 1988.

Publication history

Excalibur (vol. 1, 1988–1998)
Excalibur's original creative team, writer Chris Claremont and artist/co-writer Alan Davis, incorporated elements of two Marvel properties: the X-Men and Captain Britain.  The resulting superhero team Excalibur first gathered together in Excalibur Special Edition #1 (1988) and were soon featured in a monthly series.

Davis left with Excalibur #24 (1990) and Claremont with Excalibur #34 (1991), leaving a number of various plot points unresolved before his departure. A year later, Davis returned as both writer and illustrator with Excalibur #42. He rejuvenated the series, returning to the (mostly) lighthearted tone of his original run, while resolving many of the plotlines Claremont had left dangling.

After Davis left again in 1993 (issue #67), Uncanny X-Men writer Scott Lobdell filled in for over a year (issues #68-82). Lobdell stated one of his key goals was to create a foundation for the series beyond being another X-Men spinoff, something both he and editor Bob Harras felt the series was lacking. In addition, the tone of the series changed as well, from a lighthearted, fun comic to a more grim and depressing series.

In 1994, Warren Ellis assumed writing duties (issue #83) and, using his dark sense of humor, helped the book gain its own voice once again.  Ellis left in 1996 (issue #103) and Ben Raab, his replacement (issue #106), failed to find a voice for the series, often borrowing plotlines from other X-books. Sales fell and Marvel canceled the series, which ended with issue #125 (1998).

Excalibur (vol. 2, 2001)
In 2001, a four-issue limited series titled Excalibur was published, written by Raab.  Originally solicited as Excalibur: Sword of Power, the subtitle was absent from the published issues, and, due to an error, the indicia described it as Excalibur volume 1. In addition, the solicited cover to issue #1 was unused.

Excalibur (vol. 3, 2004)
In 2004, Marvel Comics launched a new ongoing series titled Excalibur. Aside from the name and the writer (Claremont), it had no connection to Marvel's previous Excalibur titles. The series' last issue was #14, released in May, 2005.

The letters page of the final issue of Excalibur (vol. 3) announced a relaunch of the title as New Excalibur in November, 2005.

Excalibur (vol. 4, 2019)

Excalibur was relaunched as a part of Dawn of X in October 2019. The initial roster comprised includes Betsy Braddock as the new Captain Britain, Gambit, Rogue, Jubilee, Rictor and Apocalypse.

Roster

Supporting characters
Angel (Warren Worthington III)
Captain Britain Corps
Monarch (Jamie Braddock)
Merlyn
Morgan le Fay
Opal Luna Saturnyne
Shatterstar (Gaveedra-Seven)
Pete Wisdom and S.T.R.I.K.E.
Psylocke (Kwannon)

Prints

Collected editions

Epic Collections

Omnibuses

References

1988 comics debuts
Comics by Chris Claremont
Excalibur (comics)
X-Men titles